The Sŏhae Line, also known as the Anju Colliery Line (안주 탄광선), is a partially electrified standard-gauge secondary line of the Korean State Railway in South P'yŏngan Province, North Korea, running from Mundŏk on the P'yŏngŭi Line to Hwap'ung. The line is electrified between Mundŏk and P'yŏngnam Sŏho and between Ch'ŏngnam and Sŏsi.

History
In order to exploit coal fields in the area, the Korean State Railway opened the  Mundŏk—Ch'ŏngnam—Namdong line in the 1970s. Electrification of the line to Namdong was completed in 1978. In 1987 the line was expanded in two directions - one a loop line from Samch'ŏnp'o - the Ch'ŏngnam Line - and the other an extension westwards from Ch'ŏngnam to Hwap'ung. The sections from P'yŏngnam Sŏho to Hwap'ung and to Sŏsi were later abandoned.

Services
Much of the coal that originates on the line is shipped to the Ch'ŏngch'ŏn River Thermal Power Plant on the Ch'ŏnghwaryŏk Line.

Route

A yellow background in the "Distance" box indicates that section of the line is not electrified.

Mainline

Hwap'ung Branch

Sŏngbŏp Branch 

Closed.

Sŏsi Branch

Closed from P'yŏngnam Sŏho, but Sŏsi Station is still in use via Samch'ŏnp'o.

References

Railway lines in North Korea
Standard gauge railways in North Korea